Also called the "Day of Playful Invention", Robot fest "is an annual event for anyone interested in the creative use of technology"  to promote science, technology, engineering and mathematics (STEM). It takes place at the National Electronics Museum in Linthicum, Maryland and entry is donation based.

This year's Robot Fest will occur in April 2021 and include exhibitors such as The Art Institute of Washington, MakerBot Industries and Lego. 2020 saw no event.

References

External links

FIRST Robotics Wiki
Supporting teams for competition
National Electronics Museum

Festivals in Maryland
Maryland culture
Robotics events
Tourist attractions in Anne Arundel County, Maryland
Recurring events established in 2000
2000 establishments in Maryland
Annual events in Maryland